The 1862 Montgomery by-election was a parliamentary by-election held on 14 July 1862 for the British House of Commons constituency of Montgomeryshire, known at the time as Montgomery.

Cause
The seat had become vacant when the constituency's Member of Parliament (MP), Herbert Williams-Wynn died.

Candidates
Two candidates were nominated. 

- Charles Williams-Wynn was the son of Charles Williams-Wynn, who was M.P. for Montgomeryshire 1796–1850, and was a Deputy Lieutenant and J.P. for Montgomeryshire, and captain in the Montgomery Yeomanry Cavalry. He was the Conservative Party candidate.

- Sudeley Hanbury-Tracy was a British colliery owner. He succeeded his father as Baron Sudeley in February 1863, aged 25. He also succeeded his father as Lord-Lieutenant of Montgomeryshire, a post he held until his death aged 40. He was the Liberal Party candidate.

Result

See also
 Montgomeryshire constituency
 List of United Kingdom by-elections

References

 F W S Craig, British Parliamentary Election Results 1832-1885 (2nd edition, Aldershot: Parliamentary Research Services, 1989)

1862 elections in the United Kingdom